The "Grand Union Flag" (also known as the "Continental Colours", the "Congress Flag", the 
"Cambridge Flag", and the "First Navy Ensign") is considered to be the first national flag of the United States of America.

Similar to the current U.S. flag, the Grand Union Flag has 13 alternating red and white stripes, representative of the Thirteen Colonies. The upper inner corner, or canton, features the Union Jack, or flag of the Kingdom of Great Britain, of which the colonies were subjects.

History

By the end of 1775, during the first year of the American Revolutionary War, the Second Continental Congress operated as a de facto war government, who had authorized the creation of the Continental Army, the Continental Navy, and even a small contingent of Continental Marines. A new flag was needed to represent both the Congress and the United Colonies, with a banner distinct from the British Red Ensign flown from civilian and merchant vessels, the White Ensign of the British Royal Navy, and the Flag of Great Britain carried on land by the British army. The emerging states had been using their own independent flags, with Massachusetts using the Taunton Flag, and New York using the George Rex Flag, prior to the adoption of united colors.Americans first hoisted the Grand Union Flag on the colonial warship , in the harbor on the western shore of the Delaware River at Philadelphia, Pennsylvania on 3 December 1775, under the command of the new appointed Lieutenant John Paul Jones of the formative Continental Navy. The event was documented in letters to Congress and eyewitness accounts. The flag was also used by the Continental Army forces as both a naval ensign, and as a garrison flag throughout 1776 and early 1777.

It was widely believed that the flag was raised by George Washington's army on the 2 January 1776, at Prospect Hill in Charlestown (now part of Somerville), near his headquarters at Cambridge, Massachusetts, (across the Charles River to the north from Boston), which was then surrounding and laying siege to the British forces then occupying the city. It is also stated that the flag was interpreted by British military observers in the city under commanding General Thomas Gage, as a sign of surrender. However, some scholars dispute the traditional account and conclude that the flag raised at Prospect Hill was probably the flag of Great Britain, though subsequent research supports the contrary.

The flag has had several names, at least five of which have been popularly remembered. The more recent moniker, "Grand Union Flag", was first applied in the 19th-century Reconstruction era by George Henry Preble, in his 1872 History of the American Flag.

The Grand Union Flag became obsolete following the passing of the Flag Act of 1777 by the Continental Congress.  The new national flag replaced the Union Jack in the canton with thirteen stars (representing the thirteen States) on a field of blue. The resolution describes only a "new constellation" for the arrangement of the white stars in the blue canton, so overall designs were later interpreted and made with rows, columns, a square with one star in the center, a circle, and various other designs.

Design and analysis

It is not known for certain when or by whom the design of the Continental Colours was created, but the flag could easily be produced by sewing white stripes onto the British Red Ensigns. The "Alfred" flag has been credited to Margaret Manny.

The design of the Colours is strikingly similar to the flag of the British East India Company (EIC). Indeed, certain EIC designs in use since 1707 (when the canton was changed from the flag of England to that of the flag of Great Britain) were nearly identical. However, the number of stripes varied from 9 to 15. One theory on the origin of the design is that the American colonists would have known and been familiar with the existing EIC flags and that this may have influenced the design.

The combined crosses in the flag of Great Britain symbolized the union of the Kingdom of England and the Kingdom of Scotland. The symbolism of a union of equal parts was retained in the new U.S. flag, as described in the Flag Resolution of 14 June 1777 (later celebrated in U.S. culture and history as "Flag Day").

According to the vexillologist Nick Groom, the use of the flag of Great Britain in the canton component of the flag, suggests that George Washington's army adopted it, not as a protest against the rule of the British Parliament, but instead as a profession of continued loyalty towards King George III. This view is shared by Laurie Calkhoven, a biographer of George Washington, who suggests that the flag was designed to reflect the colonists hope for justice from King George III.

In fiction

In For Want of a Nail by Robert Sobel, it serves as the flag of the Confederation of North America, a self-governing dominion created in 1843 via the second of two Britannic Designs after John Burgoyne's victory at the Battle of Saratoga in October 1777, resulting in the Conciliationists gaining control of the Continental Congress in 1778.

In The Two Georges by Harry Turtledove and Richard Dreyfuss, it serves as the flag for the North American Union and is commonly referred to as the 'Jack and Stripes'. A modified version of the flag used by the separatist Independence Party and the nativist terrorist organization the Sons of Liberty replaces the Union Jack with a bald eagle on a blue field.

In the Sliders episode Prince of Wails, set in a reality where the American Revolution was successfully suppressed, it serves as the flag of the British States of America, a heavily taxed and dictatorially-governed corner of the British Empire.

Versions of the Grand Union Flag in alternate history novels may be modified so that the Union Jack in the canton also represents Ireland.

See also

George Rex Flag
Flag of New England
Flag of Hawaii
Betsy Ross flag
Flag of the East India Company

References

Bibliography

External links
 

Flags of the United States
Continental Navy
Flags of the American Revolution
1775 introductions